Dominic Nathaniel Calvert-Lewin (born 16 March 1997) is an English professional footballer who plays as a striker for  club Everton and the England national team.

Calvert-Lewin began his career at local team Sheffield United, making his senior debut on loan at Conference North team Stalybridge Celtic in December 2014. He spent the first half of the 2015–16 season on loan at Northampton Town in League Two, and in August 2016 he joined Everton for a fee of £1.5 million. 

Calvert-Lewin was part of the England under-20 team that won the 2017 FIFA U-20 World Cup, scoring the winning goal in the final. He made his debut for the England national team in October 2020 and subsequently scored in a 3–0 friendly win against Wales at Wembley Stadium.

Club career

Sheffield United
Calvert-Lewin joined the Youth Academy of Sheffield United on 28 April 2005. After progressing through the ranks of Sheffield United youth team, he signed a scholarship with the academy when he was sixteen. At this level he played as a box-to-box midfielder.

Calvert-Lewin appeared in the first team as an unused substitute, in a 2–1 win over Aston Villa in the third round of FA Cup on 4 January 2014. After this, he was awarded for the League Football Education's 'The 11'.

On 24 December 2014, Calvert-Lewin was loaned out to Conference North team Stalybridge Celtic for a youth loan, where he began to play as a centre forward. Two days later, he scored twice on his debut, in a 4–2 win at Hyde United and scored against them again in the reverse fixture on 1 January, in a 7–1 win. At the beginning of February 2015, Calvert-Lewin returned to his parent club, having scored six times in five appearances.

In early April 2015, he signed a new long-term deal to keep him at Bramall Lane until summer 2018. Calvert-Lewin made his professional début for the senior team on 25 April in League One, in a 1–1 draw away at Leyton Orient as a 66th-minute substitute. At the end of the 2014–15 season, he went on to make two appearances. In the club's pre-season tour ahead of the 2015–16 season, Calvert-Lewin scored in a friendly match, in a 1–0 win over Ilkeston on 9 July. Following the match, manager Nigel Adkins hinted that Calvert-Lewin earned himself a first team chance in the 2015–16 season.

On 7 August 2015, Calvert-Lewin joined League Two club Northampton Town on loan until January. He made his debut four days later, scoring in a 3–0 home win against Blackpool in the first round of the League Cup. Despite being keen to extend his loan at the club, this did not materialise. By the time he left, he had made 26 appearances and scored 8 times across all competitions.

After his loan spell at Northampton Town came to an end in January 2016, Calvert-Lewin returned to the first team at Sheffield United, and did not make his first appearance until 13 February, in a 1–0 win over Doncaster Rovers. Nevertheless, he went on to make nine appearances for the team in the 2015–16 season.

Ahead of the 2016–17 season, there were hints of Calvert-Lewin making a first team breakthrough, with his former manager Wilder appointed as the new Sheffield United manager. He only made one appearance in the 2016–17 season, which was against Crewe Alexandra, in a 2–1 loss in the EFL Cup campaign.

Everton

Calvert-Lewin signed for Everton in a £1.5 million deal on 31 August 2016. He later reflected on the move as "simply too good to resist." He made his debut as a substitute in a 2–1 win over Arsenal on 13 December 2016. After missing out for two months due to ankle injury, Calvert-Lewin scored his first goal for Everton in a Premier League fixture against Hull City on 18 March 2017, a 4–0 win. On 3 May 2017, he signed a five-year contract, keeping him until 2022.

Following his U-20 World Cup performance, BBC Sport expected Calvert-Lewin to make a first team breakthrough ahead of the 2017–18 season. Calvert-Lewin scored the winner for Everton in their Europa League third qualifying round second leg against Slovakian team MFK Ružomberok on 3 August 2017. He scored his first brace for the club in the third round of the EFL Cup against Sunderland on 20 September, ending a run of three games in which Everton did not score. Calvert-Lewin signed a new contract with Everton on 14 December, along with fellow youngsters Jonjoe Kenny and Mason Holgate, keeping him at Goodison Park until June 2023.

On 24 September 2019, in his 100th Everton match, Calvert-Lewin scored both goals of a win at Sheffield Wednesday – rivals of his first club Sheffield United – in the third round of the EFL Cup. The following 6 March with his contract due to expire, and while on 15 goals from 31 games for the season, he signed a new deal to last until June 2025.

On 13 September 2020, he started the 2020–21 season by scoring the winning goal with a header in a 1–0 win over Tottenham Hotspur, followed by his first Premier League hat-trick in a 5–2 victory over West Bromwich Albion. On 30 September, he scored a hat-trick in a 4–1 win against West Ham United in the EFL Cup. That made Calvert-Lewin the first Everton player to score two hat-tricks in one month since Dixie Dean in November 1931. Calvert-Lewin scored in the fourth succession in the Premier League with a towering header against Brighton & Hove Albion in a 4–2 victory at Goodison Park on 3 October 2020. He was named as the Premier League Player of the Month for September 2020 after scoring five league goals that month. Calvert-Lewin scored in the fifth succession in the Premier League with another header against Liverpool in a 2–2 draw at Goodison Park on 17 October 2020. Calvert-Lewin scored another brace, including his ninth and 10th league goal of the season, in a 3–2 away win against Fulham on 22 November 2020. After scoring 21 goals in 39 matches in all competitions across the 2020–21 season, Calvert-Lewin was awarded Everton's Player of the Year award at their end of season awards evening. 

In September 2021, he had a fractured toe which kept him off the field for four months. On 19 May 2022, he scored the winning goal in a 3–2 victory over Crystal Palace, to secure his club's safety from relegation in the 2021–22 season.

International career

Youth
Calvert-Lewin played youth international football for England at under-20 and under-21 levels. In total, he scored six goals in 15 games for the under-20 team, and seven goals in 17 games for the under-21 team.

Calvert-Lewin made his England under-20 debut on 1 September 2016, in a 1–1 draw against Brazil, which he followed up by scoring in his second appearance, in a 2–1 loss three days later. He later scored against Germany U20 (twice) and Senegal U20.

Calvert-Lewin was selected to play for England in the 2017 FIFA U-20 World Cup in South Korea. He scored two goals in the tournament; his first was the first goal of tournament for England scored in the match against Argentina, the last was the winning goal in the final as they beat Venezuela 1–0. He joined Geoff Hurst and Martin Peters as the only England players to score in a World Cup Final.

On 27 May 2019, Calvert-Lewin was included in England's 23-man squad for the 2019 UEFA European Under-21 Championship.

Senior
Calvert-Lewin received his first England call-up by Gareth Southgate on 1 October 2020 after scoring eight goals in five appearances, including two hat-tricks, for Everton in the opening weeks of the 2020–21 season. He scored with a header in his maiden appearance for England, a 3–0 friendly win against Wales at Wembley Stadium on 8 October. He scored his first brace on 26 March 2021, in a 5–0 win against San Marino.

Style of play
Sheffield United staff Keith Briggs and Neill Collins reacted positively about Calvert-Lewin, including his attitude, while Chris Short described him as "football mad and a special talent." Manager Nigel Clough said of him: "He's a big lad who is good technically for the stage he's at and he's going to win headers against anybody", while manager Nigel Adkins described Calvert-Lewin's impressive performance in a training session: "He took the ball with his back to goal, controlled it and popped an overhead kick straight in the top corner. Brilliant stuff." Carlo Ancelotti suggested Calvert-Lewin has all the qualities to be a top striker: "He is fantastic with the head, clever in the box and sharp. I think he is going to be at the top in England and in Europe."

Personal life
Born and brought up in Sheffield, South Yorkshire, Calvert-Lewin supported Sheffield United. During his time at Northampton Town, he resided with his then teammate Ryan Cresswell and developed a good friendship.

Calvert-Lewin has been noted by fashion journalists for his choice of clothing, and in November 2021 he appeared on the front cover of Arena Homme + wearing a suit, flared shorts and a pink Prada handbag. In April 2022, he featured in British GQ with a Chanel handbag from his own collection.
In February 2020, he and Everton teammate Tom Davies used a break in the season to attend New York Fashion Week.

In May 2022, Calvert-Lewin spoke out about his mental health problems.

Career statistics

Club

International

As of match played 3 July 2021. England score listed first, score column indicates score after each Calvert-Lewin goal.

Honours
England U20
FIFA U-20 World Cup: 2017

England
UEFA European Championship runner-up: 2020

Individual
England Under-21 Player of the Year: 2018
Premier League Player of the Month: September 2020
Everton Player of the Season: 2020–21

References

External links

Profile at the Everton F.C. website
Profile at the Football Association website

1997 births
Living people
Footballers from Sheffield
English footballers
England youth international footballers
England under-21 international footballers
England international footballers
Association football forwards
Sheffield United F.C. players
Stalybridge Celtic F.C. players
Northampton Town F.C. players
Everton F.C. players
National League (English football) players
English Football League players
Premier League players
UEFA Euro 2020 players